Vasai Road Junction (station code: BSR) is a railway station on the Western line and Vasai Road–Roha line of the Mumbai Suburban Railway network.

Vasai is a historical suburban town north of Mumbai and it is located in Palghar district. It is a much modern part of Vasai Taluka. It is a part of the new Vasai-Virar city.

It is a major railway station which bypasses Mumbai and connects the trains coming from Vadodara to Konkan Railway and Pune Junction railway station and further towards cities of Bengaluru and Hyderabad

Station layout

Seven of the eight platforms at Vasai Road are laid out side by side.

Vasai Road is an important cross over point between Western and Central railways in Mumbai, as trains from Konkan region and Pune cross over to the Western line here.

Platforms 2–5 handle the local trains in the up & down directions. Platform 6 and 7 handle outstation trains that have a halt at Vasai Road. They also handle two Rajdhani Express trains.

1. 12431/12432 Thiruvananthapuram Rajdhani Express

2. 22413/22414 Madgaon Rajdhani Express

Also, it handles Humsafar Express, Duronto Express, Sampark Kranti Express trains from Kerala side towards Delhi.

Platform 1 is a dedicated platform to handle local trains that start/terminate at Vasai Road. Also platform 6 and 7 holds freight train for going towards Diva. The recent developments at Vasai railway station is the inclusion of elevator and lifts on the old as well as the new footover bridges. Currently, The Western Railway is planning to build a new outstation train terminus. The new terminus, set to come up by 2023, will also ease the present bottleneck at Vasai Road station. The project plan received a boost when Union railway minister Piyush Goyal on August 23, 2018 announced exploring the feasibility of a new main line terminal at Vasai Road.

Gallery

References

Transport in Vasai-Virar
Mumbai Suburban Railway stations
Mumbai WR railway division
Railway stations in Palghar district